Janine Pritchard is a justice with the Supreme Court of Western Australia. She is an alumnus of both Australian National University and the University of London.

Controversy
In 2013, Justice Pritchard dismissed a West Australian Stolen Generations compensation claim.

This was after the official apology on 13 February 2008 by the then Prime Minister Kevin Rudd to Australia's Indigenous people's on behalf of the Australian government, when he said: 

It was also after Australia had legislated in 2002 to make genocide a crime in Australia under the UN Convention on the Prevention and Punishment of the Crime of Genocide which includes the definition "forcibly transferring children of the group to another group".

Justice Pritchard said in her 410-page judgement dismissing the case, while she felt for the family, its case was not established:

References

Judges of the Supreme Court of Western Australia
Living people
Australian women judges
Year of birth missing (living people)